Willie Phiri (3 June 1953 – 2 June 2011) was a Zambia international football midfielder and manager.

Career
Born in Northern Rhodesia, Phiri played club football for local side Nchanga Rangers F.C. for nearly fifteen years.

Phiri made several appearances for the senior Zambia national football team, including eleven FIFA World Cup qualifying matches, and played at the 1974 and 1978 African Cup of Nations finals.

After retiring from playing football in 1983, Phiri became a coach. He was appointed manager of Nchanga Rangers F.C. in 1984.

Personal

Born to policeman Mulimakwenda Phiri. Willie Phiri's father hoped for better ambitions for his first-born son and supported his education more than a fledgling soccer career. If anything Phiri senior opposed his sons love for the global game seeing it as more of a distraction towards attaining a better and secure future. However it was Phiri seniors friend Damiano Mutale who betrayed him and subsequently unearthed one of Zambia's best ever midfield players. Damiano had been observant of the young Phiris talents as he played amongst his friends. Convinced of the possibility of a real talent being unexposed, he whisked young Willie Phiri off to see the local towns football club Nchanga Rangers manager at the time. The manager gave him the opportunity for a trial that he excelled in and at the age of 15 became one of the youngest members of the club and played in a midfield role.

Phiri Went on to be a local legend for the club that he went on to manage. In January 1993 Phiri got involved in a road traffic accident that left him requiring the use of a wheelchair. His love for the sport continued and was instrumental with Nchanga Rangers and the national teams accolades throughout his entire life. Willie Phiri died one day short of his 58th birthday. Famously remembered for his free kicks, banana shots and the dribble known as "walking walking" the memoirs of this legend will forever live on in the hearts of those who knew him.

Willie Phiri was survived by wife Alice Ivy Phiri and five children, two boys Willie Phiri Jnr and Fumbani Phiri and three girls Michelle Phiri-Kazala, Tracy Phiri-Bath and Karen Mukanzo-Phiri.

References

External links

1953 births
2011 deaths
Zambian footballers
Zambia international footballers
1974 African Cup of Nations players
1978 African Cup of Nations players
Nchanga Rangers F.C. players
Zambian football managers
Association football midfielders